Melanoplus lakinus, the lakin grasshopper, is a species of spur-throated grasshopper in the family Acrididae. It is found in North America.

References

External links

 

Melanoplinae
Articles created by Qbugbot
Insects described in 1878